The 1898 Central Colonels football team represented Central University in Richmond, Kentucky during the 1898 college football season. The team defeated Vanderbilt and Centre.

Schedule

References

Central
Eastern Kentucky Colonels football seasons
College football undefeated seasons
Central Colonels football